"Ragga Ragga" is a song by Malawian-born artist and record producer Gemini Major. It was released on June 10, 2016 for free digital downloads and on June 24, 2016 on iTunes by Family Tree Records. The song was produced by Gemini Major, features Riky Rick, Cassper Nyovest, Nadia Nakai and Major League DJz. The song was an instant hit and received massive radio play, establishing Gemini Major as both an artist and a producer.

Music videos
The music video for "Ragga Ragga" was released via Gemini Major's YouTube account on September 30, 2016 and has over 1.2 million views.

Composition and release

Accolades

References

External links 

Lyrics of this song at Bimba

2016 singles
2016 songs
Song recordings produced by Gemini Major
South African hip hop songs